Biassoni is an Italian surname. Notable people with the surname include:

Aurelio Biassoni (1912–?), Italian footballer
Marco Biassoni (1930–2002), Italian cartoonist, humorist, and filmmaker

Italian-language surnames